Jergé Hoefdraad (17 July 1986 – 3 August 2021) was a Dutch professional footballer who last played as a left winger for Dutch club De Volewijckers. He formerly played for RKC Waalwijk, Almere City, Telstar and Cambuur.

Death
On 1 August 2021, Hoefdraad was shot at a party in Amsterdam-Zuidoost, while trying to calm a quarrel. He was admitted to a hospital in critical condition. The next day, authorities had reported him to be dead, but they later clarified he was still in critical condition. However, he died in the hospital on 3 August 2021.

References

External links

1986 births
2021 deaths
Footballers from Amsterdam
Dutch footballers
Dutch sportspeople of Surinamese descent
Association football wingers
Eredivisie players
Eerste Divisie players
Place of death missing
RKC Waalwijk players
Almere City FC players
SC Telstar players
SC Cambuur players
Deaths by firearm in the Netherlands
Dutch murder victims
Male murder victims
People murdered in the Netherlands